KEWF is a commercial radio station in Billings, Montana, broadcasting on 98.5 FM. KEWF airs a country music format branded as “98.5 The Wolf”. The station formerly went by the call letters KGHL- FM before former sister station KGHL- AM 790 was sold to new owner Northern Broadcasting System. Licensed to Billings, Montana, United States, the station serves the Billings area.  The station is currently owned by Radio Billings, LLC.

Current On Air Staff
Wolf Waking Crew
Colt Jackson: 2pm to 7pm
CMT Radio Live with Cody Alan (nationally syndicated)
Lonnie Bell: Sundays 8-12

References

External links
98.5 The Wolf Facebook
Official Website

EWF
Country radio stations in the United States
Radio stations established in 1976
1976 establishments in Montana